Kal-e Lat (also Romanized as Kal-e Lāt) is a village in Baladeh Rural District, Khorramabad District, Tonekabon County, Mazandaran Province, Iran. At the 2006 census, its population was 59, in 20 families.

References 

Populated places in Tonekabon County